LAJVAR Industrial Group is an Iranian crane manufacturing company that was established in 1985 in Arak. Products include truck-mounted cranes, telescopic cranes, hydraulic cylinders, pneumatic cylinders and line trucks.

This company exports its products mainly to Romania, Azerbaijan, UAE, Sudan, Kuwait, Qatar, Jordan and Armenia.

Lajvar is the largest crane manufacturer in the Middle East.

References 

Iranian brands
Crane manufacturers
Manufacturing companies established in 1985
Companies based in Arak
Iranian companies established in 1985
Companies of Iran
Construction equipment manufacturers of Iran